The electronic receipt or e-receipt is an electronic Receipt of any product or service that was purchased.

Implementation 
Digital receipts are normally sent via e-mail or via an app. Unlike paper receipts, e-receipts are used to reduce paper usage. These e-receipts are used to inform the customer of rebates and discounts. Another important purpose is to use the digital receipts as marketing instrument. Another reason for the use of e-receipts is Business Intelligence. Through the usage of these e-receipts, companies can track their customers easier in terms of purchases, which supports the Business intelligence. Through this companies can adapt their marketing campaign towards the customers. The e-receipt helps to connect customers to their in-store purchases. Merchants can issue E-receipts using own mechanisms or use external services specialized on electronic payments. 

Possible ways of distributing the email receipts may be to send an e-mail, an app, a website/web app or a BLE transmit on mobile. The general idea of the e-receipt remains the same, there are only different ways of distribution. There are many different companies that already offer their customers e-receipts. In the following part these different companies and technologies are compared and their pros and cons are discussed.

Mandates 
In January 2019, a California assemblyman introduced a proposed bill that would prohibit businesses from issuing customers paper receipts unless they explicitly request one.

See also
 Electronic billing
 Electronic invoicing
 Electronic ticket

References

Electronic documents
Electronic trading systems
Accounting source documents